A Touch Away (Merchak Negi'aa; Hebrew, מרחק נגיעה) is a 2006 Israeli drama television miniseries set in Bnei Brak, a city to the east of Tel Aviv, within the larger Tel Aviv District, in Israel. It has been described as a kind of Romeo and Juliet story, focusing on the relationship of a young secular Jewish immigrant from Russia who falls in love with a young woman who is part of the city's Haredi community. Using this relationship as the basis for the story, the series explores the lives of new immigrants, non-religious, and religious Jews in Israel.

Synopsis

The drama series revolves around a hopeless love story between an orthodox religious young woman and a Russian immigrant. The lives of two families interconnect in an apartment complex in the orthodox neighborhood of Bnei Brak, just outside Tel Aviv. The Bermans are a strictly religious family, whose daughter Rochale is about to enter into an arranged marriage with a wealthy young bridegroom. But sparks fly when a thoroughly secular family from Russia moves into a neighboring apartment. The forbidden love that soon blossoms between the two young neighbors, and the secrets that each family must hide, threaten the families deeply rooted traditions and challenge individual family member's beliefs.

Cast
Yarden Bar-Kokhva as Lea Berman
Gaya Traub as Roha'le Berman
Slava Bibergal as Sasha Mintz
Henry David as Zorik Mintz
Yevgenia Dodina as Marina Mintz
Lucy Dubinchik as Natalia Mintz
Tzahi Grad as Shmuel Berman
Yehezkel Lazarov as Aaron Berman
Nitai Gvirtz as Arieh Leiv

Production

The series was created by Zafrir Kochanovsky, Ronit Weis-Berkowitz, and Ron Ninio; and directed by Ron Ninio. It is produced by Zafrir Kochanovsky and Miri Ezra (T.T.V. Productions), and aired on Reshet. Dialogue is conducted in Hebrew, Russian and some Yiddish, with subtitles in Hebrew, Russian, and English.

Release

The series, first released as part of the Haifa International Film Festival on October 12, 2006, and then aired on Israeli television beginning January 23, 2007, broke many Israeli television viewing records, with the final episode garnering more viewers than any Israeli drama up until that time.

The series made its debut in the United States at the 2008 Santa Barbara International Film Festival. The episodes have been shown as part of a number of other United States film festivals, as well as other festivals and programs in Israel, and other nations around the world, sometimes followed by discussions of Israel and religious themes involved in the story.

Awards

Actor Henry David won the 2006 Israeli Television Academy Best Actor Award. Additionally, the series won 2007 Awards of the Israeli Television Academy including "Best Directing", "Best Script", "Best Actor", "Best Art Design", and "Best Original Score". It also won the 2008 Washington Jewish Film Festival "Special Audience Recognition Award."

Unmade American version

In 2008, HBO announced that it had secured the rights to the series, and was planning to produce an American version, retaining the Israel location and story. It is one of a number of rights deals signed in 2008 for Israeli shows being considered for American TV.

See also
Religion in Israel
Culture in Israel
Television in Israel

References

External links
 
 Jweekly.com Review, June 6, 2008.
 Photo Gallery
 Trailer.

Israeli culture
Jewish culture
Television series about Jews and Judaism
Israeli drama television series
Channel 2 (Israeli TV channel) original programming
2000s Israeli television series
2007 Israeli television series debuts
Films about Orthodox and Hasidic Jews
Anti-Orthodox Judaism sentiment